Romford and Gidea Park Rugby Club is a rugby union club in Romford, east London, England.  They currently play in London 2 North East - a league at the seventh tier of the English rugby union system.

A Brief history

Like nomads, rugby players in Romford have been on the move since their first match in 1929. It was not until September, 1983 that the club were able to 'touch down' at a base that they could properly call home, following the purchase of a  site in Crow Lane.

In 1929, the founder members, Leslie Diebel and Jimmy Paxton, placed an advert in the local newspaper inviting anyone interested in playing rugby to attend a meeting in the Ship Inn in Gidea Park. Following this meeting, The Ship became the first headquarters of the Gidea Park Rugby Club. The first match was played against Chingford, but the result has long since been forgotten in the mist of time. In those early days, the club used a sports ground at Gallows Corner in Gidea Park for their home matches.

With no rugby during the Second World War, the club was reformed in 1946, moving in 1949 to play home matches at Raphael's Park. It was then that the now familiar colours of black, purple and white were adopted from the crest of Lord Raphael.

In 1953, the club moved again - this time to Cottons Park. The players built their own clubhouse and as the club's popularity increased, so did the clubhouse! As befitting its new location, Romford was added to the club's name - "Gidea Park and Romford RFC". Two years later, this appellation was changed to the present "Romford and Gidea Park RFC". With Ralph Klar MC as the driving force, another small extension was added. In 1961, Ralph was elected as the club's first life member.

During the 1960s and 70s, the club flourished and was the welcome recipient of a healthy influx of Welsh schoolteachers, including Romford legends like Glyn Johns (an inspiring and uncompromising prop forward) and Lynn Herbert (a product of the Welsh fly-half factory). Indeed, at one time, the first XV boasted a total of 14 Welsh regulars, along with their captain Alec Daly - A Scot!

In the 1970s, the club regularly fielded 5 senior sides and, with the increasing popularity of junior and mini rugby, the clubhouse and playing facilities were outgrown. So the search was on to find yet another home. In 1981, with Pat Ridley (a much revered club character and Club President 1975–85) to the fore, the club negotiated the purchase of their present home within easy access of Romford centre. After two years hard work and fundraising,  of land were converted into four pitches and a purpose built clubhouse with changing accommodation was constructed.

The club continued to thrive. Scrum half Dave Duffus returned from Hong Kong, where he had played for the colony in their Hong Kong Sevens, to skipper the club for a record 5 seasons. Other notable captains included Maurice Washbourne, who later became a successful Club Chairman during the 1990s, and the Scottish trialist Mike Lovatt.

Another important development was the installation of floodlights on the main pitch, which then enabled the club to start hosting county finals.

Recent seasons have seen the senior sides to strive to match the developments and success of a youth and mini section. Ian "Paddy" Dunston (England Colts, 1988) gained the distinction of being the club's first international with Terry Ellis playing for England Schools U16s in 1997. In the 2004 season Jon Mason represented England 18 Group v France Ireland and Wales, while Frank Neale was selected for England Colleges. Adam Powell was also fast-tracked into the U19 England squad and played in their Grand Slam Six Nations programme and also played in the U19 World Cup in South Africa where England finished fourth. Many successful tours have been undertaken, including trips to France, Italy and South Africa.

2002 bought another milestone to the club when the long serving Dai Davies was elected County president. During his two-year presidency, Essex became independent of Eastern Counties and gained their own Constituent Body Status of the RFU. Dai has now taken over the Presidency from the long serving Ron Johnson for the start of the 2005/06 season.

The 2003/04 season saw the club establish a Ladies XV - The Romford Ravens. The team are developing well and are set to become a prominent part of the club during the forthcoming seasons, as the club looks forward to the next 75 years!

Club Honours
London Division 2 North East champions (3): 1993–94, ( Unbeaten League) season. 2002–03 , 2011–12
Essex Cup Winners (2): 1990-91, 2014-15
Essex 7’s winners 1984-85. 1993-94. 
Essex Colts Cup Winners 1992-93 and 1994-95.

See also
 Essex RFU

External links
 Club website

Romford
Rugby clubs established in 1929
Rugby union clubs in London